Mary-Kate and Ashley: Get A Clue is a 2000 video game from Acclaim Entertainment. “Get a Clue” represented part of Club Acclaim, a push by Acclaim to lure more girls and families to games.

Development
The game was announced in February 2000.

Reception

IGN gave the game a score of 6 out of 10 stating". The game is exactly the same as the last version with slight changes in the sprite animations which means, it's not all that bad. It's just disappointing to see that Acclaim is green-lighting the technique of duplicating existing games for "new" titles"

The Journal Times gave the game a score of 4 out of 5 stating"It is simple to follow, and the step-by-step thinking process is good for girls ages 8 and older. I don't think boys will get it"

References

2000 video games
Mary-Kate and Ashley Olsen
Acclaim Entertainment games
Video games based on real people
Video games featuring female protagonists
Crawfish Interactive games
Game Boy Color-only games
Game Boy Color games